Radhaballabhpur  is a village in Chanditala I community development block of Srirampore subdivision in Hooghly district in the Indian state of West Bengal.

Geography

Gram panchayat
Villages in Haripur gram panchayat are: Anantarampur, Bade Sola, Baghati, Ban Panchbere, Chak Bangla, Chota Choughara, Dudhkomra, Haripur, Ichhapasar, Jagmohanpur, Mamudpur and Radhaballabhpur.

Demographics
As per 2011 Census of India, Radhaballabhpur had a total population of 1,655 of which 818 (49%) were males and 837 (51%) were females. Population below 6 years was 184. The total number of literates in Radhaballabhpur was 1,186 (80.63% of the population over 6 years).

References 

Villages in Chanditala I CD Block